Full House is a 2004 South Korean television series starring Song Hye-kyo, Rain, Han Eun-jung and Kim Sung-soo. Based on the manhwa Full House by Won Soo-yeon, the romantic comedy series aired on KBS2 on Monday  and Friday at 21:50 (KST) timeslot for 16 episodes from July 14 to September 28, 2004.

Considered a pioneer of the "romantic comedy" genre in Korean drama, the drama was a great success in Asia and helped propel the Korean Wave.

Synopsis
Han Ji-eun (Song Hye-kyo), an aspiring scriptwriter, lives in a house called "Full House" built by her late father. One day, her two best friends trick her into believing that she has won a free vacation. While she is away, they sell her house. On the plane, she meets a famous actor named Lee Young-jae (Rain). Through comedic events, they get acquainted during her vacation and when she returns, she discovers that her house has been sold to him.

Though they do not get along with each other due to their contrasting habits, they agree to live with each other. At first, Ji-eun works as his maid in order to buy her house back. However, later, they enter into a contract marriage as Young-jae wanted to make his crush, Kang Hye-won (Han Eun-jung), jealous. Complications arise as Ji-eun and Young-jae become attracted to each other.

Cast
 Song Hye-kyo as Han Ji-eun
An optimistic and cheerful girl who lives in the "Full House", which she inherited from her parents. She is an aspiring writer. She ends up marrying Young-jae under a contract marriage in order to keep the "Full House", but later falls in love with him.
 Rain as Lee Young-jae
A popular Korean actor. Though appearing to be egotistical and stubborn, he cares deeply for his friends. He possess secret unrequited feelings for his childhood friend, Hye-won but later falls in love with Ji-eun. He has a fragile relationship with his father, who is a doctor.
 Han Eun-jung as Kang Hye-won
A close family friend of Young-jae, who knows him since childhood. Working as a fashion designer, she also designs most of Young-jae's clothes. With her wealth and looks, she is accustomed to attention from men, but has ever only loved Yoo Min-hyuk. She is selfish and manipulative, and attempts to hold on to Min-hyuk and Young-jae at the same time.
 Kim Sung-soo as Yoo Min-hyuk
A play boy, he is smart and rich, but remains detached from people because of his busy lifestyle. He is also close friends with Young-jae, who confides in him his feelings for Han Ji-eun. Min-hyuk is a director of a large media company. He develops feelings for Han Ji-eun, and tries to get her to like him. Eventually, he sees that she can love no one else but Lee Young-jae.
Jang Yong as Mr. Lee, Young-jae's father
 Sunwoo Eun-sook as Mrs. Kim, Young-jae's mother
 Kim Ji-young as Young-jae's grandmother
 Lee Young-eun as Yang Hee-jin, Ji-eun's friend
 Kang Do-han as Shin Dong-wook, Hee-jin's husband
 Im Ye-jin as Dae Pyo, Young-jae's manager

Filming locations
The location of the titled house, Full House, is a house built specially for the series. It is located in the Gwangyeok-si area of Incheon, near Incheon International Airport, and is a ten-minute boat ride from Sammok Harbor. Nearby sightseeing locations include Jogak (sculpture) Park on Modo Island; a bridge connects these two islands. The house remained a tourist attraction until it was torn down in April 2013 due to irreparable damage from a typhoon.

The first episode was shot in Shanghai near The Bund. In later episodes, some parts were filmed in Thailand.

Original soundtrack
Full House (Inst.)
운명 [Fate] - WHY
Forever (Inst.)
I Think I - Byul
시 (Inst.)
친구란 말 [The End of Being Friends] - Noel
운명 [Fate] (Full Slow Inst.)
Blue Hills (Inst.)
운명 [Fate] (Slow Ver.)
I Think I Love You (Guitar Inst.)
늦게 핀 사랑 (Too Late) [Love Bloomed Late (Too Late)] - G.Soul
Forever - WHY
운명 [Fate] (Semi Slow Inst.)
Love at the Gate (Inst.)
고마워할게요 [I'm Thankful] - Byul
늦게 핀 사랑 (Too Late) [Love Bloomed Late (Too Late)] (Violin Inst.)
Amazing Love (Inst.)
Paradiso (Inst.)
운명 [Fate] (Inst.)
처음 그 자리에 [The First Time in the First Place] - Lee Boram
타이틀셔플 (허밍)
샤랄라 (허밍)

Ratings
In this table,  represent the lowest ratings and  represent the highest ratings.

Musical theatre
A musical theatre production of Full House was staged at the Hongik Art Center beginning April 11, 2014. Yang Yo-seob and Leo (VIXX) alternate in the role of Lee Young-jae, while Jung Eun-ji and Joo alternate in the role of Han Ji-eun. Also starring were UJi (Bestie), Kim San-ho, Seo Ha-joon, and Kwak Sun-young.

Awards and nominations
2004 KBS Drama Awards
 Top Excellence Award, Actress - Song Hye-kyo
 Excellence Award, Actor - Rain
 Popularity Award, Actor - Rain
 Popularity Award, Actress - Song Hye-kyo
 Best Couple - Rain and Song Hye-kyo

Remakes and sequel

References

External links
 Full House official KBS website 
 
 

2004 South Korean television series debuts
2004 South Korean television series endings
AZN Television original programming
Korean Broadcasting System television dramas
Korean-language television shows
South Korean romantic comedy television series
South Korean television series remade in other languages
Television shows based on manhwa
Television series by Kim Jong-hak Production